The 2019 Florida State Seminoles football team represented Florida State University during the 2019 NCAA Division I FBS football season. The Seminoles played their home games at Doak Campbell Stadium in Tallahassee, Florida, and competed as members of the Atlantic Division in the Atlantic Coast Conference.

Florida State was initially led by second-year head coach Willie Taggart. On November 3, 2019, Taggart was fired after losing to Miami (FL) and falling to 4–5 on the season and 9–12 overall. Defensive line coach Odell Haggins was named interim head coach for the remainder of the season, for the second time during his tenure with the program. The Seminoles ultimately finished the season with a 6–7 record, completing consecutive losing seasons for the first time since the 1975 and 1976 seasons. This was the first season since 1976 that Florida State was not ranked in either of the major polls. Running back Cam Akers went on to be selected in the second round of the NFL Draft.

Previous season
Florida State finished the 2018 season 5–7, 3–5 in ACC play, to finish in fifth place in the Atlantic Division. The Seminoles had a losing record for the first time since 1976 and missed a bowl game for the first time since 1981.

Preseason

Coaching changes
In December 2018, the school hired Kendal Briles to be the new offensive coordinator and quarterbacks coach, replacing Walt Bell, who left to take the head coaching job at UMass. Briles spent the 2018 season as offensive coordinator at Houston. In January 2019, the school hired alum Ron Dugans to coach wide receivers. In February 2019, the school fired offensive line coach Greg Frey and hired Randy Clements to the same position; Briles and Clements previously worked together on the Houston staff.

Player news
Quarterback Deondre Francois was dismissed from the team in February 2019 after Francois' girlfriend posted a video to Instagram which alleged domestic abuse. Francois had been the starting quarterback for the Seminoles during the 2016 and 2018 seasons (an injury sustained in the first game of 2017 sidelined him for most of that season), and was set to be the starter again as a senior.

In March 2019, former Wisconsin quarterback Alex Hornibrook announced that he was transferring to Florida State for his final season of eligibility as an NCAA graduate transfer. In August 2019, Jordan Travis, a transfer quarterback from Louisville, was granted a waiver by the NCAA to be immediately eligible to play.

Recruiting
Florida State's 2019 recruiting class consisted of 21 recruits. The class was ranked 21st in the nation and second in the ACC according to the 247Sports.com Composite. This represented the lowest-ranked class for the school since 2007.

Spring game
The 'Garnet and Gold Game' was held on April 6 with the Gold team, led by James Blackman, victorious over the Garnet team by a score of 27–21.

Preseason media poll
In the preseason ACC media poll, Florida State was selected to finish third in the Atlantic Division. Wide receiver Tamorrion Terry and defensive tackle Marvin Wilson were named to the preseason All-ACC team.

Award watch lists

Listed in the order that they were released

Schedule
Florida State's 2019 season was set to begin with a non-conference neutral site game at TIAA Bank Field in Jacksonville, Florida, against Boise State of the Mountain West Conference, though the game was relocated to Tallahassee due to Hurricane Dorian. In ACC play, the Seminoles played the other members of the Atlantic Division as well as Virginia and Miami from the Coastal Division. To end the year, Florida State played on the road against rival Florida of the Southeastern Conference (SEC).

Game summaries

vs. Boise State

Louisiana–Monroe

at Virginia

Louisville

NC State

at Clemson

at Wake Forest

Syracuse

Miami (FL)

at Boston College

Alabama State

at Florida

vs. Arizona State (Sun Bowl)

Honors

All-ACC
The Seminoles had six players selected to the All-ACC team, with four defensive selections and two offensive selections.
Marvin Wilson (First Team)
Cam Akers (Second Team)
Tamorrion Terry (Second Team)
Hamsah Nasirildeen (Second Team)
Asante Samuel, Jr. (Third Team)
Stanford Samuels III (Honorable Mention)

Personnel

Roster

Coaching staff

Players drafted into the NFL

References

Florida State
Florida State Seminoles football seasons
Florida State Seminoles football